PorSuiGieco y su Banda de Avestruces Domadas, also known as Porsuigieco or PorSuiGieco, was an Argentine folk rock supergroup consisting of Charly García, Nito Mestre (from Sui Generis), León Gieco, Raúl Porchetto and María Rosa Yorio (Garcia's wife). The band was active only in 1975. The only album that they released was Porsuigieco. They performed live only two times. After 1976, the band was dissolved. In 1978 they briefly reunited to play at a festival in Buenos Aires.

Discography 
 Porsuigieco (1976)

Band members 
 Charly García – keyboards, piano, guitar, bass, vocals
 Nito Mestre – guitar, flute, vocals
 León Gieco – guitar, harmonica, tambourine, vocals
 Raúl Porchetto – guitar, vocals
 María Rosa Yorio – vocals

Argentine folk music groups
Argentine rock music groups